Glavan or Hlavan is a surname. Notable people include:

 Andrej Glavan (born 1943), Slovenian Roman Catholic prelate
 Damir Glavan (born 1974), Croatian water polo player
 Igor Glavan, alternative transliteration of Ihor Hlavan (born 1990), Ukrainian race walker
 Marcel Glăvan (born 1975), Romanian-Spanish canoeist
 Marina Glavan (born 1991), Croatian handball player
 Ruxanda Glavan (born 1980), Moldovan politician

See also
 

Croatian surnames
Romanian-language surnames
Slovene-language surnames
Ukrainian-language surnames